Christians in Benin constitute approximately 48.5 of the country's population (2022 estimate).

According to the 2002 census, 27.1 percent of the population of Benin is Roman Catholic, 5 percent Celestial Christian, 3.2 percent Methodist, 7.5 percent other Christian groups (Baptists, Assemblies of God, Pentecostals, Seventh-day Adventists, the Church of Jesus Christ of Latter-day Saints (Mormons), Jehovah's Witnesses, Rosicrucians, the Unification Church).

Christianity first reached Benin in 1680, gaining more permanent footing in the 19th century. English Methodists arrived in 1843, operating amongst the coastal Gun people.

Roman Catholicism 

The Catholic hierarchy in Benin consists of the Archdiocese of Cotonou (including the Dioceses of Abomey, Dassa-Zoumé, Lokossa, Porto Novo) and the Parakou (including the Dioceses of Djougou, Kandi, Natitingou, and N'Dali).

In 2011 it was reported that in Benin there were 440 priests and 900 men and women in religious orders.

Many nominal Christians also practice traditional local religious beliefs.

See also

Religion in Benin
Islam in Benin

References

External links 
Archdiocese of Cotonou